Bach is a surname of German-language origin. Notable people with the surname include:

The family of Johann Sebastian Bach

Johann Sebastian Bach ("JSB", 1685–1750), composer and organist, the most well-known of the Bachs
Wilhelm Friedemann Bach (1710–1784), composer and organist, son of JSB
Carl Philipp Emanuel Bach (1714–1788), composer, harpsichordist and pianist, son of JSB
Johann Aegidius Bach (1645–1716), organist and conductor, uncle of JSB
Johann Ambrosius Bach (1645–1695), violinist and trumpeter, father of JSB
Johann Bernhard Bach (1676–1749) composer, harpsichordist and organist, cousin of JSB
Johann Christoph Friedrich Bach (1732–1795), composer, son of JSB
Johann Christian Bach (1735–1782), composer, son of JSB
Johann Christoph Bach (1642–1703), composer and organist, great-uncle of JSB
Johann Gottfried Bernhard Bach (1715–1739), organist, son of JSB
Johann Ludwig Bach (1677–1731), composer and violinist, second cousin of JSB
Johann Michael Bach (1648–1694), composer and organist, great-uncle and father-in-law of JSB
Johann Michael Bach III (1745–1820), composer and lawyer, nephew of JSB
Johann Sebastian Bach (painter) (1748–1778), painter, grandson of JSB

Others
 Baron Alexander von Bach (1813–1893), Austrian politician and statesman
 Barbara Bach (born 1947), American actress
 Bela Bach (born 1990), German politician
 Børge Bach (1945-2016), Danish footballer
 Catherine Bach (born 1954), American actress
 Claus-Peter Bach, German rugby union official
 Dirk Bach (1961–2012), German actor
 Edward Bach (1886–1936), British medical doctor known for his work in alternative medicine
 Emmanuelle Bach (born 1968), French film and television actress
 Emmon Bach (1929–2014), American linguist
 Ernst Bach (1876-1929), German comedy writer
 Franciscus Hermanus Bach (1865–1956), Dutch painter
 Fritz Bach (1934–2011), Austrian-born American transplant physician and immunobiologist
 Jan Bach (1937-2020), American composer
 Jean Bach (1918–2013), American film director
 John Bach (born 1946), New Zealand actor
 Kent Bach (born 1943), American philosopher
 Kristina Bach (born 1962), German singer
 Mechthild Bach (1949-2011), German soprano
 Ole Christian Bach (1957–2005), Norwegian financier
 Pamela Bach (born 1963), American actress
 Paul Bach (1938–2011), English journalist and editor
 Pierre-Antoine-Jean Bach (1932–2020), French-born Laotian Roman Catholic prelate
 Richard Bach (born 1936), American novelist
 Sebastian Bach (born 1968), Canadian former lead singer of Skid Row, and later performer on Broadway
 Sheldon Bach (1925-2021), American psychologist
 Tamara Bach (born 1976), German youth book author
 Thomas Bach (born 1953), German sports official and president of the International Olympic Committee (IOC)
 Vincent Bach (1890–1976), Austro-American cornet and trumpet player and manufacturer
 Vivi Bach (1939–2013), Danish actress and singer

See also
Bache (disambiguation)
Bạch (a Vietnamese surname)

German-language surnames